Love Conquers All is a 1934 German comedy film directed by Georg Zoch and starring Trude Marlen, Susi Lanner, and Jakob Tiedtke.

The film's sets were designed by the art director Erich Czerwonski.

Plot 
Advertising photographer Willy Schneider and musician Max Brehmer live poorly but contentedly under one roof, in a studio. When the caretaker Neumann wants to collect the rent, Willy is being taken over by the advertising manager of the Berger Silk Syndicate, Döring. He would like to have some of his advertising photos to present to his boss, director Berger. At Herr Berger's domicile, he sees Renée Neumann, his property manager's daughter, who works as a shorthand typist in a car dealership, leaving the director's house. They both drive away together in their car, and they begin to fall in love. As a passionate photographer that he is, Willy naturally also takes a photo of Renée. The two lovebirds make an appointment for the following day in a café. The next day, however, Renée commits a faux pas, because she did not return the dress that her sister Elli had secretly borrowed for yesterday's visit in time, so that Elli, who needed the dress for an interview as a prospective singer in a theater, did not get the job she had hoped for got. In order to be at least useful for something, Elli wants to relieve her old father and now collect the urgently needed rent from Max and Willy. Elli gets to know Max and they both like each other. When Max finds out about Ellis Malheur and the botched theater engagement, he wants to help her and says she should accompany him on his next engagement as a musician, he will somehow find a place for her in this variety show.

Meanwhile, Renée, who is supposed to look after old Seiden-Berger at her boss's car dealership, who is interested in a new car, is stopped by him, so that she misses her appointment with Willy in the café. The photographer is angry about this and, disappointed, leaves the photo of Renée, which was taken yesterday, to the Berger Group. Her likeness is promptly used for advertising purposes and will soon be emblazoned on all the city's posters, which makes Renée very angry and disappointed, because she really didn't expect that from her new acquaintance. Due to further complications, Willy soon feels deceived by his great love. He wants to reconcile with her, but fails completely. Father Neumann notices that Renée is also devastated and guesses the reason for this. When musician Max invites his friend Willy to his performance in the Odeon Theater, old Neumann also drags his daughter there. To his great surprise, he has to realize that daughter Elli is also present and is on stage with Max. Even more surprising for him is the information that Max and Elli have become engaged in the meantime. Now he can turn his full attention to the reconciliation work concerning Renée and Willy, but the two have long since found each other and cleared up all the misunderstandings.

Cast

References

Bibliography

External links 
 

1934 films
Films of Nazi Germany
German comedy films
1934 comedy films
1930s German-language films
Films directed by Georg Zoch
Tobis Film films
German black-and-white films
1930s German films